Cambrai is a small town located on the eastern side of the Mount Lofty Ranges, along the River Marne. Originally named Rhine Villa, it was one of many Australian towns renamed during World War I to remove any connection with German place names and named after the Battle of Cambrai.

It was located on the Sedan railway line. It served as the terminus of the line from 1964 until the 1980s.

The bounded locality of Cambrai includes the former unbounded locality of Rheinthal, which was approximately 3 km north of the town of Cambrai. It had a Lutheran church and school. The school was closed from 1916 (when all German schools were closed) until 1935, and closed permanently from 1955. It also includes the Marne Valley Conservation Park and the locality of Kongolia (previously Rhine Park) to the east of the town.

References

External links

Towns in South Australia